Major General Nicholas Charles Laybourne Perry,  (born  1972) is a British Army officer who served as Assistant Chief of the General Staff between 2021 and 2022.

Military career
Perry is the son of Richard Laybourne Perry and his wife Susan Margaret Cave-Browne. Educated at Ampleforth College and the Royal Military Academy Sandhurst, Perry was commissioned into the Royal Hussars on 12 September 1992.

After serving as Chief of Staff for Task Force Helmand in winter 2010, and commanding 22 SAS Regiment in 2012, Perry became military advisor to the Prime Minister in 2015. He went on to be commander of 16 Air Assault Brigade in 2017, and Assistant Chief of the General Staff in March 2021.

Perry was appointed a Companion of the Distinguished Service Order for his service in Afghanistan in 2008, and a Member of the Order of the British Empire (MBE) for his service in Afghanistan in 2010.

References

British Army generals
Royal Hussars officers
King's Royal Hussars officers
British Army personnel of the War in Afghanistan (2001–2021)
People educated at Ampleforth College
Companions of the Distinguished Service Order
Members of the Order of the British Empire
Year of birth missing (living people)
Living people